The Arawak village of Wakapau (or Wakapoa) is located in the Pomeroon-Supenaam Region of Guyana, on the Wakapau River, a tributary on the west bank of the Pomeroon River,  from its mouth. The name originates from the Lokono word ‘Wakokwãn’, which means pigeon. The village is composed of twenty inhabited islands. Some of the islands only contain a single family. 

Wakapau was one of the ten original "Indian reservations" of British Guiana. The village is an example of an Amerindian community that has not only preserved the traditional Arawak culture, but also retained its tribal language. The community consists of island settlements in the swamps surrounded by forests. The economy is based on logging, subsistence farming and boat services.

It has three primary and one secondary school.

References

Populated places in Pomeroon-Supenaam
Indigenous villages in Guyana